The Rosebud egg is a jewelled enameled Easter egg made by Michael Perchin under the supervision of the Russian jeweller Peter Carl Fabergé in 1895, for Nicholas II of Russia, who presented the egg to his wife, Empress Alexandra Feodorovna. It was the first Fabergé egg that Nicholas presented to Alexandra.

History
After the death of Alexander III of Russia, his son, Nicholas married Princess Alix of Hesse and by Rhine, who subsequently became Empress Alexandra of Russia, following the accession to the throne of her husband, Nicholas II of Russia. Princess Alix missed the rose garden of Rosenhöhe, Darmstadt, and so this egg reminded her of them during her first Easter with her new husband. The familiar yellow rose in 1895 was the yellow China tea rose that had been introduced by Parkes from China in 1824, re-bloomed in fall and was a staple of milder gardens than Saint Petersburg, where it was not hardy. Yellow roses were the most valued ones in the Empress' native Germany.

The egg embodied Fabergé's embrace of Neo-Classicism, in opposition to the dominance of Art Nouveau in late 19th century contemporary design. Fabergé charged 3,250 rubles for the egg.

In 1917 the egg was confiscated by the Russian Provisional Government and later sold to Emanuel Snowman of the jewellers Wartski around 1927. It was owned by a certain Charles Parsons in the 1930s, and was lost for decades, amid rumours that it had been damaged in a marital dispute. It was this damage that helped Malcolm Forbes identify the egg when he purchased it in 1985 from the Fine Art Society in London. In 2004 it was sold as part of the Forbes Collection to Viktor Vekselberg. Vekselberg purchased some nine Imperial eggs from the collection, for almost $100 million.

The egg is now part of the Victor Vekselberg Collection, owned by The Link of Times Foundation, and housed in the Fabergé Museum in Saint Petersburg, Russia.

Surprise

The egg opens like a bonbonnière to reveal a yellow-enamelled rosebud, in which two surprises were originally contained; a miniature version of the Imperial Crown of Russia with diamonds and two cabochon rubies and an egg-shaped ruby pendant suspended from it.  The crown was a reference to Alexandra Feodorovna's new role as Empress of Russia, following the accession to the throne of her husband, Nicholas II of Russia.

For decades, the surprises were considered to be lost, but  in an article published in September 2021 in The Burlington Magazine and a second one published in early 2022 in the Fabergé Research Newsletter, it is claimed they have been identified. They are the surprises contained in the so-called Lapis Lazuli egg owned by the Cleveland Museum of Art.

See also
Egg decorating

References

Sources

External links

The Rosebud Egg

Imperial Fabergé eggs
1895 works
Fabergé Museum in Saint Petersburg, Russia